Johan Brunell (born May 29, 1991) is a Finnish footballer who plays for FF Jaro as a centre back.

Club career

FF Jaro 
Brunell began his professional career in the Finnish Veikkausliiga with FF Jaro.  He stayed with the club in 2016 when they were relegated to the Ykkönen.  In January 2014 Brunell was offered a contract by German 3. Liga club Chemnitzer FC but could not reach an agreement on the terms of the contract.

Toronto FC 
On March 16, 2017, Toronto FC announced that they had signed Brunell to a contract after he spent time as a trialist during the 2017 pre-season. Brunell was waived just two weeks later, without making an appearance for the club.

References

External links

1991 births
Living people
People from Jakobstad
Finnish footballers
Finnish expatriate footballers
FF Jaro players
Toronto FC players
Association football defenders
Expatriate soccer players in Canada
Veikkausliiga players
Ykkönen players
Jakobstads BK players
Sportspeople from Ostrobothnia (region)